Bucculatrix ramallahensis is a moth in the family Bucculatricidae. It is found in Palestine. It was described in 1935 by Hans Georg Amsel.

References

Bucculatricidae
Moths described in 1935
Taxa named by Hans Georg Amsel
Moths of the Middle East